Bertodano Bay is a bay between Bodman Point and Cape Wiman on the north side of Seymour Island. The name appears on Argentine navy charts from 1957 and recalls J. Lopez de Bertodano, chief engineer in the Argentine corvette Uruguay during the rescue of the shipwrecked Swedish Antarctic Expedition in 1903.

References
 

Bays of the James Ross Island group